This is a list of Members of Parliament (MPs) elected to the House of Commons of the United Kingdom by English constituencies for the Fifty-Eighth Parliament of the United Kingdom (2019–present).

It includes both MPs elected at the 2019 general election, held on 12 December 2019, and those subsequently elected in by-elections.

The list is sorted by the name of the MP, and MPs who did not serve throughout the Parliament are italicised. New MPs elected since the general election are noted at the bottom of the page.

Composition

MPs in the East of England region

MPs in the East Midlands region

MPs in the London region

MPs in the North East region

MPs in the North West region

MPs in the South East region

MPs in the South West region

MPs in the West Midlands region

MPs in the Yorkshire and the Humber region

By-elections
 2021 Batley and Spen by-election
 2021 Chesham and Amersham by-election
 2021 Hartlepool by-election
 2021 North Shropshire by-election
 2021 Old Bexley and Sidcup by-election
 2022 Birmingham Erdington by-election
 2022 City of Chester by-election
 2022 Southend West by-election
 2022 Stretford and Urmston by-election
 2022 Tiverton and Honiton by-election
 2022 Wakefield by-election
 2023 West Lancashire by-election

See also
 2019 United Kingdom general election in England
 List of MPs elected in the 2019 United Kingdom general election
 List of MPs for constituencies in Northern Ireland (2019–present)
 List of MPs for constituencies in Scotland (2019–present)
 List of MPs for constituencies in Wales (2019–present)

Notes

References

England
2019
MPs